WSBS (860 kHz) is a commercial AM radio station in Great Barrington, Massachusetts.  It is owned by Townsquare Media and has a full service adult contemporary radio format, mixed with local news, talk and sports.  World and national news is supplied by ABC News Radio.  WSBS is an affiliate of the Boston Red Sox Radio Network.

History
On , the station first signed on the air.  For most of its history, WSBS was a daytimer, required to go off the air at sunset.  Through the 1950s, 60s, 70s and 80s, WSBS broadcast a middle of the road format, with local news and sports prominent on its schedule.  By the 1990s, the music had moved to an adult contemporary playlist.

In August 2013, Gamma Broadcasting reached a deal to sell its Berkshire County radio stations, including WSBS, to Reed Miami Holdings; the sale was canceled on December 30, 2013. In October 2016, Gamma agreed to sell its stations to Galaxy Communications; that sale also fell through, and in 2017 the stations were acquired by Townsquare Media.

Technical information
WSBS transmits 2,700 watts daytime with a Marconi 1959 series-fed -wave tower. The primary transmitter is a Harris SX2.5, and a backup Gates 250GY. The nighttime transmitter is an LPB.

References

External links

WSBS's studios & tower at NECRAT

SBS
Mainstream adult contemporary radio stations in the United States
Great Barrington, Massachusetts
Mass media in Berkshire County, Massachusetts
Radio stations established in 1956
1956 establishments in Massachusetts
Townsquare Media radio stations